Michael Wendl may refer to:

 Michael Christopher Wendl, mathematician and biomedical engineer
 Michael J. Wendl (born 1934), engineer in the area of aerospace control